Stark and Starke are German and English surnames; in the German language stark means "strong" or "powerful". Notable people with the surname include:

People

Stark
Andrew Stark (born 1964), Australian street photographer
Anthony Stark (1961–2011), American Film director and screenwriter
Arthur C. Stark (1846–1899), British medical doctor and naturalist
Arthur James Stark (1831–1902), English painter
Benjamin Stark (1820–1898), American merchant, politician; U.S. Representative and U.S. Senator (D-OR)
Chris Stark (born 1987), British radio personality
Christine Stark (born 1970), Canadian volleyball player
David Stark (disambiguation), several people
Dolly Stark (1885–1924), American baseball coach and player
Edward W. Stark (1869–1935), American politician
Ethel Stark (1916–2012), Canadian violinist and conductor
Etilmon J. Stark (1868–1962), American composer and arranger
Dame Freya Stark (1893–1993), English writer about the Middle East
Graham Stark (1922–2013), English comedian, actor, writer and director
Hans Stark (1911–1988), German SS officer and concentration camp overseer at Auschwitz concentration camp
Harold Stark (born 1939), American mathematician
Harold Rainsford Stark (1880–1972), U.S. Navy admiral during WWII
Helen Stark, one of the Perth Martyrs
Henry Powning Stark (1827-1870), New Zealand politician
Ian Stark (born 1954), Australian equestrian, Olympic medalist in eventing
James Stark (disambiguation), several people
Janne Stark (contemporary), Swedish music writer, author and musician
Jayson Stark (born 1951), American sportswriter
Johannes Stark (1874–1957), German physicist; Nobel Prize laureate
John Stark (1728–1822), American Revolutionary War general
Johnny Stark (talent manager) (1922-1989), French talent manager
John Stillwell Stark (1841–1927), American music publisher
Jürgen Stark (born 1948), German banker
Lars Johan Stark (1826-1910), American politician
Leonid Stark (1889-1937), Russian and Soviet revolutionary, diplomat and editor
Koo Stark (born 1956), American actress, model, and photographer
Leonard P. Stark (born 1969), American judge
Lisa K. Stark (born 1959), American judge
Lloyd C. Stark (1886–1972), United States former governor of Missouri
Mabel Stark (1889–1968), American circus performer
Melissa Stark (born 1973), American television personality
Menachem Stark (1974–2014), American businessman who was kidnapped and murdered in an intended robbery
Mike Stark, American author, activist, blogger and commentator
Oskar Victorovich Stark (1846–1928), Russian vice-admiral
Pesach Stark (born 1905), birth name of Julian Stryjkowski, Polish journalist and writer
Pete Stark (1931–2020), American politician; U.S. Representative (D-CA) 
Ray Stark (1915–2004), American film producer
Richard Stark, (born 1933), pseudonym of American writer Donald E. Westlake 
Robert L. Stark (1951), American real estate developer
Rodney Stark (born 1934), American sociologist of religion
Rudolf Stark (1897-?), German flying ace
Sandra Stark (born 1951), American photographer
Tibor Stark (born 1972), Hungarian weightlifter
Wilbur Stark (1912–1995), American film producer
William Henry Stark (1851-1936), American businessman
Wolfgang Stark (born 1969), German football referee
Zoe Stark (contemporary), Australian actress

Starke
Annie Starke (born 1988), American actress 
George Starke (born 1948), American football player
Hayden Erskine Starke (1871–1958), Australian judge
Mariana Starke (born 1762?), English traveller and author
Peter Burwell Starke (1815-1888), Confederate general
Tom Starke (born 1981), German football goalkeeper
William E. Starke (1814-1862), Confederate general

Fictional characters surnamed Stark
Albert Stark, the main character of the 2014 A Million Ways to Die in the West, played by Seth MacFarlane
Coyote Starrk (Bleach), in the Bleach manga/anime universe
Dieter Stark, a character in The Lost World: Jurassic Park
Eric John Stark, a character created by Leigh Brackett
Sergeant Ethan Stark, in a novel trilogy by John G. Hemry 
George Stark, in Stephen King's novel The Dark Half
Jim Stark, the main character of Rebel Without A Cause
Paul Stark, the main character played by Jeffrey Tambor on the 1986 TV series Mr. Sunshine
House Stark, a fictional noble family in the fantasy novel series A Song of Ice and Fire and its derived works, including TV series Game of Thrones and several games based on the novel series.
 Ned Stark
 Catelyn Stark
 Robb Stark
 Sansa Stark
 Arya Stark
 Bran Stark
 Rickon Stark
 Stark family in Marvel Comics
 Howard Stark, father of Tony Stark
 Maria Stark, mother of Tony Stark
 Tony Stark, superhero Iron Man
 Tony Stark (Marvel Cinematic Universe), the 21st-century film version of this superhero
 Morgan Stark, Tony Stark and Pepper Potts's daughter 
 Lizzie Stark, a character from the British TV series Peaky Blinders
Nathan Stark, in the Eureka universe
Deputy District Attorney Sebastian Stark, the main character in the TV series Shark
Stark (Farscape), in the TV series Farscape
 Tandy Stark, a gamer played by Tandy Tatter in the British web series Corner Shop Show
title character of Willie Stark, a 1981 opera by Carlisle Floyd
Willie Stark (character), in the novel All the King's Men and its film adaptations

See also 

Starck
Starck (disambiguation)
Starker (Starcker)
Stark (disambiguation)

References

English-language surnames
German-language surnames